Alva Russell Derry (October 7, 1916 – October 26, 2004) was an American professional baseball player from Princeton, Missouri. He appeared in 187 Major League Baseball games as an outfielder for New York Yankees in 1944 and 1945, the Philadelphia Athletics in 1946, and the St. Louis Cardinals in 1949.

Derry had 124 career hits in 553 Major League at bats. In 1949, Derry led the International League with 42 home runs, and is a member of the International League Hall of Fame.

He died on October 26, 2004, in Kansas City, Missouri.

References

External links

 Baseball-Reference
 

1916 births
2004 deaths
Baseball players from Missouri
Binghamton Triplets players
Columbus Red Birds players
Joplin Miners players
Kansas City Blues (baseball) players
Major League Baseball outfielders
Modesto Reds players
Newark Bears (IL) players
New York Yankees players
Norfolk Tars players
People from Princeton, Missouri
Philadelphia Athletics players
Rochester Red Wings players
St. Louis Cardinals players
San Antonio Missions players